Dalbergia balansae also known as Dalbergia assamica is a species of legume in the family Fabaceae.
It is found in China and Vietnam.
It is threatened by habitat loss.

References

balansae
Flora of China
Flora of Vietnam
Vulnerable plants
Taxonomy articles created by Polbot